The 2019–20 NBL season was the 1st season for the South East Melbourne Phoenix in the NBL.

Roster

Depth chart

Preseason 
As part of their first season in the NBL, the Phoenix had an extended pre-season. Their first two games were part of a tour of China, before they had five games in Melbourne against another Chinese team and three NBL teams. As a club in the NBL they also took part in the NBL Blitz and played games against the Sydney Kings and the New Zealand Breakers, however they opted out of the NBLxNBA games.

Ladder

Game log 

|- style="background-color:#ccffcc;"
| 1
| 30 May
| @ Jiangsu Dragons
| W 73-92
| Kyle Adnam (23)
| Dane Pineau (8)
| Kyle Adnam (5)
| Wutaishan Gymnasium
| 1-0
|- style="background-color:#ffcccc;"
| 2
| 1 June
| @ Shanghai Sharks
| L 76-71
| Kendall Stephens (22)
| Not announced
| Not announced
| Yuanshen Sports Centre Stadium
| 1-1

|- style="background-color:#ccffcc;"
| 1
| 25 August
| Zhejiang Lions
| W 90-78
| Isaac Turner (18)
| Dan Trist (9)
| Kyle Adnam (4)
| State Basketball Centre
| 1-0
|- style="background-color:#ffcccc;"
| 2
| 4 September
| Cairns Taipans
| L 102-106
| John Roberson (25)
| Tai Wesley, Dane Pineau (7)
| Tai Wesley (6)
| State Basketball Centre
| 1-1
|- style="background-color:#ccffcc;"
| 3
| 6 September
| Brisbane Bullets
| W 85-80
| Tai Wesley (25)
| Tai Wesley (9)
| John Roberson (8)
| Traralgon Sports Stadium
| 2-1
|- style="background-color:#ccffcc;"
| 4
| 8 September
| Cairns Taipans
| W 93-80
| Tai Wesley (21)
| Keith Benson (11)
| Tai Wesley, John Roberson (6)
| Kilsyth Basketball Stadium
| 3-1
|- style="background-color:#ffcccc;"
| 5
| 15 September
| Illawarra Hawks
| L 98-109
| Ben Madgen, John Roberson (18)
| Dane Pineau (15)
| Tai Wesley (3)
| Lauren Jackson Sports Centre
| 3-2

|- style="background-color:#ccffcc;"
| 1
| 20 September
| Sydney Kings
| W 96-87
| John Roberson (31)
| Dane Pineau, Daniel Trist (6)
| Kyle Adnam, John Roberson (4)
| Devonport Recreation & Function Centre
| 1-0
|- style="background-color:#ccffcc;"
| 2
| 22 September
| New Zealand Breakers
| W 102-95
| Tai Wesley (23)
| Ben Madgen (9)
| John Roberson (7)
| Derwent Entertainment Centre
| 2-0

Regular season 
The regular season of the NBL consisted of 28 games, with the Phoenix's 14 home games shared between Melbourne Arena and the State Basketball Centre. The Phoenix are also playing in the opening game against their cross-town rivals, Melbourne United, in the NBL Throwdown.

Ladder

Game log 

|- style="background-color:#ccffcc;"
| 1
| 3 October
| @ Melbourne United
| W 88-91
| Mitch Creek (28)
| Mitch Creek (11)
| Creek, Trist, Roberson (3)
| Melbourne Arena 
| 1-0
|- style="background-color:#ccffcc;"
| 2
| 13 October
| Brisbane Bullets
| W 113-93
| John Roberson (30)
| Ben Madgen (8)
| Mitch Creek (7)
| Melbourne Arena
| 2-0
|- style="background-color:#ccffcc;"
| 3
| 19 October
| Illawarra Hawks
| W 106-102
| John Roberson (26)
| Dane Pineau (10)
| John Roberson (1)
| Melbourne Arena
| 3-0
|- style="background-color:#ffcccc;"
| 4
| 25 October
| @ Perth Wildcats
| L 110-79
| Jaye Crockett (12)
| Dane Pineau (8)
| Ben Madgen (5)
| RAC Arena
| 3-1
|- style="background-color:#ccffcc;"
| 5
| 27 October
| Adelaide 36ers
| W 101-91
| John Roberson (24)
| Dane Pineau (8)
| John Roberson (7)
| Melbourne Arena
| 4-1

|- style="background-color:#ffcccc;"
| 6
| 2 November
| Melbourne United
| L 98-110
| Mitch Creek (23)
| Mitch Creek, Jaye Crockett (7)
| Mitch Creek (7)
| Melbourne Arena
| 4-2
|- style="background-color:#ccffcc;"
| 7
| 9 November
| New Zealand Breakers
| W 103-78
| Mitch Creek 21
| Mitch Creek 11
| John Roberson 9
| Melbourne Arena 
| 5-2
|- style="background-color:#ffcccc;"
| 8
| 16 November
| @ Melbourne United
| L 96-95
| Mitch Creek (27)
| Keith Benson (8)
| John Roberson (6)
| Melbourne Arena
| 5-3
|- style="background-color:#ffcccc;"
| 9
| 18 November
| Adelaide 36ers
| L 91-103
| Mitch Creek (22)
| Mitch Creek (11)
| John Roberson (6)
| Melbourne Arena
| 5-4
|- style="background-color:#ffcccc;"
| 10
| 23 November
| Sydney Kings
| L 86-90
| John Roberson (25)
| Dane Pineau (12)
| John Roberson (6)
| Melbourne Arena
| 5-5
|- style="background-color:#ccffcc;"
| 11
| 30 November
| @ Brisbane Bullets
| W 95-110
| Ben Madgen (23)
| Dane Pineau (9)
| John Roberson (6)
| Nissan Arena
| 6-5

|- style="background-color:#ffcccc;"
| 12
| 8 December
| Perth Wildcats
| L 98-108
| Mitch Creek (31)
| Ben Madgen (11)
| Gibson, Roberson, Wesley (4)
| Melbourne Arena
| 6-6
|- style="background-color:#ffcccc;"
| 13
| 13 December
| @ Adelaide 36ers
| L 113-111
| Mitch Creek (27)
| Mitch Creek (11)
| Mitch Creek, John Roberson (4)
| Adelaide Entertainment Centre
| 6-7
|- style="background-color:#ccffcc;"
| 14
| 15 December
| Cairns Taipans
| W 112-105
| John Roberson (32)
| Mitch Creek, Dane Pineau (9)
| Tai Wesley (6)
| Melbourne Arena
| 7-7
|- style="background-color:#ffcccc;"
| 15
| 20 December
| @ New Zealand Breakers
| L 90-84
| Mitch Creek (24)
| Dane Pineau (9)
| John Roberson (7)
| Horncastle Arena
| 7-8
|- style="background-color:#ffcccc;"
| 16
| 23 December
| @ Sydney Kings
| L 110-98
| John Roberson (25)
| Mitch Creek (12)
| Kyle Adnam, John Roberson (5)
| RAC Arena
| 7-9
|- style="background-color:#ccffcc;"
| 17
| 28 December
| Illawarra Hawks
| W 112-102
| John Roberson (28)
| Tai Wesley (7)
| John Roberson, Tai Wesley (5)
| Melbourne Arena
| 8-9
|- style="background-color:#ffcccc;"
| 18
| 31 December
| @ Cairns Taipans
| L 92-84
| John Roberson (19)
| Dane Pineau (9)
| Mitch Creek, John Roberson (5)
| Cairns Convention Centre
| 8-10

|- style="background-color:#ffcccc;"
| 19
| 5 January
| New Zealand Breakers
| L 92-97
| John Roberson (31)
| Dane Pineau (19)
| John Roberson, Tai Wesley (6)
| State Basketball Centre
| 8-11
|- style="background-color:#ccffcc;"
| 20
| 12 January
| @ Illawarra Hawks
| W 82-90
| Kendall Stephens (20)
| Dane Pineau (18)
| John Roberson (7)
| WIN Entertainment Centre
| 9-11
|- style="background-color:#ffcccc;"
| 21
| 17 January
| @ Perth Wildcats
| L 97-71
| Devondrick Walker (16)
| Dane Pineau (8)
| John Roberson (6)
| RAC Arena
| 9-12
|- style="background-color:#ffcccc;"
| 22
| 19 January
| @ Sydney Kings
| L 98-81
| John Roberson (27)
| Dane Pineau (13)
| John Roberson (4)
| Qudos Bank Arena
| 9-13
|- style="background-color:#ffcccc;"
| 23
| 23 January
| @ Brisbane Bullets
| L 108-101
| John Roberson (26)
| Mitch Creek, Dane Pineau (10)
| Kyle Adnam (7)
| Nissan Arena
| 9-14
|- style="background-color:#ffcccc;"
| 24
| 26 January
| Cairns Taipans
| L 102-103
| Mitch Creek (32)
| Mitch Creek (10)
| John Roberson (7)
| State Basketball Centre
| 9-15

|- style="background-color:#ffcccc;"
| 25
| 2 February
| @ Adelaide 36ers
| L 100-93
| Mitch Creek (27)
| Dane Pineau (11)
| Mitch Creek (5)
| Adelaide Entertainment Centre
| 9-16
|- style="background-color:#ffcccc;"
| 26
| 9 February
| Sydney Kings
| L 96-99
| Kyle Adnam, John Roberson (19)
| Dane Pineau (13)
| John Roberson (6)
| Melbourne Arena
| 9-17
|- style="background-color:#ffcccc;"
| 27
| 14 February
| @ New Zealand Breakers
| L 92-83
| John Roberson (15)
| Dane Pineau (7)
| John Roberson (8)
| Horncastle Arena
| 9-18
|- style="background-color:#ffcccc;"
| 28
| 16 February
| Melbourne United
| L 90-109
| Ben Madgen (23)
| Tai Wesley (6)
| Kyle Adnam (7)
| Melbourne Arena
| 9-19

Awards

Player of the Week 

Round 1, Mitch Creek

Round 11, John Roberson

Round 14, John Roberson

See also 

 2019–20 NBL season
 South East Melbourne Phoenix

References

External links 

 Official Website

South East Melbourne Phoenix
South East Melbourne Phoenix seasons
South East Melbourne Phoenix season
South East Melbourne Phoenix season